Scott Adams Scoops is a compilation of video games designed by Scott Adams and published by U.S. Gold for a variety of home computers: Pirate Adventure, Strange Odyssey, Voodoo Castle, and Buckaroo Banzai.

Development
The compilation features text–only versions of four games designed by Scott Adams and previously published by Adams' Adventure International: Pirate Adventure (1979), Strange Odyssey (1979), Voodoo Castle (1979), and Buckaroo Banzai (1985). Buckaroo Banzai (co-written with Philip Case) is based on the 1984 film The Adventures of Buckaroo Banzai Across the 8th Dimension and was previously only released for the TI-99/4A.

Reception

Scott Adams Scoops received mixed to negative reviews. Peter Sweasey from ZX Computing Monthly rated the game as "Grim". A reviewer for Computer and Video Games considered Buckaroo Banzai to be their least favorite game by Scott Adams.

References

External links 
 
 

1987 video games
Adventure games
Square Enix video game compilations
Video games developed in the United States
ZX Spectrum games